Aleksander Okińczyc (Aliaksandr Akinchyts, 1839–1886) was a Polish and French 19th century physician and memoirist of Belarusian ethnicity.

He was sent to Siberia by Tsar Alexander II's troops after participating in the January Uprising in Belarus, Poland and Lithuania. From there he succeeded in escaping to the West together with Zygmunt Mineyko and other prisoners. He re-established himself in France and became a doctor.

There he wrote in Polish the story of his adventure, which was later translated to French by Joséphine Bohdan. The original Polish written version of the memoirs seems to be owned by Jean and Madeleine Okinczyc. The doctor died in Villepreux. There, the "Association des amis du vieux Villepreux" offers a museum about the "Docteur Alexandre" and there is a street named "rue du Docteur Alexandre".

References

1839 births
1886 deaths
People from Byaroza District
People from Pruzhansky Uyezd
Belarusian physicians
19th-century Belarusian people
19th-century Polish scholars
January Uprising participants
Emigrants from the Russian Empire to France
Belarusian emigrants to France